Galatasaray SK. Men's 1987–1988 season is the 1987–1988 volleyball season for Turkish professional basketball club Galatasaray Yurtiçi Kargo.

The club competes in:
Turkish Men's Volleyball League
CEV Champions Cup

Team Roster Season 1987–1988

Results, schedules and standings

Results

Pts=Points, Pld=Matches played, W=Matches won, L=Matches lost, F=Points for, A=Points against

Turkish Volleyball League 1987–88

Regular season

First half

Second half

Milli Eğitim Gençlik ve Spor Bakanlığı Cup 1988

CEV European Champions Cup 1988

References

Galatasaray S.K. (men's volleyball) seasons
Galatasaray Sports Club 1987–88 season